Marek Sikora is a Polish astronomer.

Habilitation of astrophysics received in 1990 from University of Warsaw. Received the title of professor in 1999. He currently works as a professor in the Centrum Astronomiczne im. Mikołaja Kopernika PAN, Polish Academy of Sciences  in Warsaw. He is interested mainly high energy astrophysics, Astrophysical jet, the nuclei of active galaxies,  and sources of cosmic radiation.

Published works 
2008, 3C 454.3 Reveals the structure and physics of its Blazar zone, The Astrophysical Journal, 675, pp. 71, 2008 Marek Jan Sikora, Rafal Moderski, Gregory Maria Madejski 
2008 Multiwavelength Observations of the Powerful Gamma-Ray Quasar PKS 1510-089: Clues on the Jet Composition, The Astrophysical Journal, 672, pp. 787, 2008 Marek Jan Sikora, Rafal Moderski, Kataoka et al. (Sikora, M .; Moderski, R.) 
2008 Radio-loudness of Active Galaxies and the Black Hole Evolution, New Astronomy Reviews, 51, pp. 891, 2008 Marek Jan Sikora, Lukasz Stawarz, JP Lasota 
2007 Radio-loudness of active galactic nuclei: observational facts and Theoretical implications, The Astrophysical Journal, 658, pp. 815, 2007 Marek Jan Sikora, Lukasz Stawarz, JP Lasota 
2007 On Magnetic Field in Broad-line Blazars, Proceedings "Recontre de Moriond" 2007 Marek Jan Sikora, Rafal Moderski, 
2007, Radio loudness of AGNs: host galaxy morphology and the spin paradigm Proceedings of "Extragalactic Jets: Theory and Observations from Radio is Gamma Rays", 2007, Marek Jan Sikora, Lukasz Stawarz, JP Lasota 
2006 Dynamics and high-energy emission of the flaring HST-1 wick in the M87 jet, Monthly Noticies of the RAS, 370, p. 981, 2006 Marek Jan Sikora, Lukasz Stawarz, F. Aharonian, Kataoka J. Ostrowski M., Siemiginowska A.
2005 Klein-Nishina effects in the spectra of non-thermal sources immersed in external radiation fields, Monthly Noticies of the RAS, 363, p. 954, 2005 Marek Jan Sikora, Rafal Moderski, Coppi PS Aharonian, F.

References

Living people
21st-century Polish astronomers
Year of birth missing (living people)
20th-century Polish astronomers